was a town located in Aida District, Okayama Prefecture, Japan.

As of 2003, the town had an estimated population of 3,625 and a density of 57.17 persons per km². The total area was 63.41 km².

On March 31, 2005, Aida, along with the towns of Mimasaka (former), Ōhara and Sakutō, the village of Higashiawakura (all from Aida District), and the town of Katsuta (from Katsuta District), was merged to create the city of Mimasaka.

In the 1990s, Aida's TI Circuit hosted two Formula One races called the Pacific Grand Prix.

Geography

Adjoining municipalities
Okayama Prefecture
Mimasaka (town)
Sakutō
Wake
Saeki
Bizen
Misaki

Education
Aida Elementary School
Aida Junior High School

Transportation

Road
National highways:
Route 374
Prefectural roads:
Okayama Prefectural Route 46 (Wake-Sasame-Sakutō)
Okayama Prefectural Route 90 (Akō-Saeki)
Okayama Prefectural Route 362 (Iden-Yūka)
Okayama Prefectural Route 379 (Dōdō-Kashimura)
Okayama Prefectural Route 414 (Fukumoto-Wake)
Okayama Prefectural Route 426 (Tama-Takimiya)

Notable places and events
Okayama International Circuit
Chōfukuji Temple

External links
Official website of Mimasaka in Japanese

Dissolved municipalities of Okayama Prefecture
Articles lacking sources from June 2009
All articles lacking sources
Mimasaka, Okayama